Aphaostracon is a genus of very small or minute freshwater and brackish water snails that have an operculum, aquatic operculate gastropod mollusks in the family Cochliopidae.

Species
This genus includes the following species:
Aphaostracon asthenes F. G. Thompson, 1968
Aphaostracon chalarogyrus F. G. Thompson, 1968
Aphaostracon hypohyalinus F. G. Thompson, 1968
Aphaostracon monas (Pilsbry, 1899)
Aphaostracon pachynotus F. G. Thompson, 1968
Aphaostracon pycnus F. G. Thompson, 1968
Aphaostracon rhadinus F. G. Thompson, 1968
Aphaostracon theiocrenetus F. G. Thompson, 1968
Aphaostracon xynoelictum F. G. Thompson, 1968

References

  Hershler R. & Thompson F.G. (1992) A review of the aquatic gastropod subfamily Cochliopinae (Prosobranchia: Hydrobiidae). Malacological Review suppl. 5: 1-140.

 
Cochliopidae
Taxonomy articles created by Polbot